John Anning Leng Sturrock (14 June 1930 – 15 August 2017) was an English writer, editor, reviewer and translator who was closely associated with the Times Literary Supplement and later the London Review of Books.

He was the son of the politician John Leng Sturrock.

Selected publications

Author
 French New Novel: Claude Simon, Michel Butor, Alain Robbe-Grillet. Oxford University Press, Oxford, 1969. ISBN 9780192121783
 Paper Tigers: Ideal Fictions of Jorge Luis Borges. Oxford University Press, Oxford, 1977. ISBN 0198157460
 The French Pyrenees. Faber, London, 1988. ISBN 0571137415 
 The Language of Autobiography: Studies in the first person singular. Cambridge University Press, Cambridge, 1993. ISBN 0521412900 
 The Word from Paris: Essays on modern French writers and thinkers. Verso, London, 1998. ISBN 185984832X
 Structuralism. Blackwell, Oxford, 2002.

Editor
 Structuralism and Since: From Lévi Strauss to Derrida. Oxford University Press, Oxford, 1979. ISBN 0192158392
 The Oxford Guide to Contemporary Writing. Oxford University Press, Oxford, 1996. ISBN 0198182627
 The Oxford Guide to Contemporary World Literature. Oxford University Press, Oxford, 1996. ISBN 0192833189

Translations
De Gaulle, Israel and the Jews, Praeger, 1969, Transaction Publishers, 2004, Routledge, 2017. In French:De Gaulle, Israël et les Juifs, Paris: Plon, 1968.

References

External links

1930 births
2017 deaths
English writers
People from Ashtead
People educated at King's School, Bruton
Alumni of Lincoln College, Oxford
English magazine editors
English translators
Translators from French
English literary critics
20th-century British translators